Bedford railway station (formerly Bedford Midland Road and historically referred to on some signage as Bedford Midland) is the larger of two railway stations in the town of Bedford in Bedfordshire, England. It is on the Midland Main Line from London St Pancras to the East Midlands and the terminus of the Marston Vale line from Bletchley through Bedford St Johns.

History 
The original station was built by the Midland Railway in 1859 on its line to the Great Northern at Hitchin.

The Midland crossed it on the level and there was a serious collision when an LNWR train passed a red signal. (Curiously,  both drivers were named John Perkins). Following this accident, the Midland built a flyover in 1885.

The extension to  opened in 1868.  The connection to  ceased public services during 1961, but the line north of Bedford to Wigston Junction is still officially referred to as the Leicester to Hitchin line. At this time the station was substantially altered, with the replacement of a level crossing by the Queen's Park overbridge. In 1890 fast lines were added to the west to allow expresses to bypass the station.

Serious damage occurred during World War II when a bomb destroyed the booking hall's glass ceiling. The current station was built to replace it and was opened by Sir Peter Parker (chairman of BR) on 9 October 1978. The station car park was enlarged to cater for 450 cars plus 52 short-wait spaces in the forecourt which had separate areas for cars and taxis to set down and pick up passengers. A covered walkway linked the station with bus stops in Ashburnham Road. As part of the modernisation work, the slow lines were realigned to the west next to the 1890 fast lines to pass between two new platforms.

Although the intention was for what remained of the old awnings to be transferred to the Midland Railway at Butterley in Derbyshire it proved impossible to save them. Nothing remains of the original station buildings.

A new connection, which runs along the formation formerly used by the abandoned line to Hitchin (closed to passenger traffic from 1 January 1962 and completely three years later), was laid from the Marston Vale branch up to the main line to permit this. The original St Johns station closed on 14 May 1984 with a replacement halt on the new chord opening the same day. Bletchley trains henceforth used a bay platform (numbered 1A) on the eastern side of the station.

Services 

The station is served by three operators and managed by Thameslink.

 East Midlands Railway
 London Northwestern Railway (Service suspended from December 2022)
 Thameslink

East Midlands Railway services that call at Bedford are run under the sub brand of “EMR Connect”. This service started in May 2021 and is operated by Class 360 Electric Multiple Units running on the twice hourly stopping service from London St Pancras to Corby. Occasional “EMR Intercity” services do call at Bedford during the peak hours and on Sunday mornings to Nottingham and Leicester without requiring a connection at Kettering.

The station is the northern terminus of the Thameslink route with Thameslink services operating to Brighton through St Albans and London St Pancras. Services from the station also call at Luton Airport Parkway and Gatwick Airport. These services use  electric multiple units. Thameslink also runs a few services a day to Sutton on the Sutton Loop line, via both Wimbledon and Mitcham Junction.

London Northwestern Railway operates local services to  via the Marston Vale Line using Class 230 units. There is no Sunday service on this line. 

The typical off-peak service in trains per hour (tph) is: 
 2tph to Brighton via Gatwick Airport (Thameslink)
 2tph to Three Bridges via Redhill (Thameslink)
 2tph to London St Pancras (East Midlands Railway)
 2tph to Corby (East Midlands Railway)
 1tph to Bletchley (London Northwestern Railway) Service currently suspended

Community Rail Partnership 

In common with other stations on the Bedford to Bletchley Marston Vale line, Bedford station is covered by the Marston Vale Community Rail Partnership. The partnership aims to increase use of the Marston Vale line by getting local people involved with their local line.

A second CRP with Bedford Midland as its northern terminus - the Beds & Herts Community Rail Partnership (formerly the Bedford to St Albans City Community Rail Partnership) - has been set up, covering the eight stations on the Midland main line between Bedford Midland and St Albans City

Facilities 

The station has the following facilities:
2 waiting rooms
Cafe/newsagent/bar and coffee bar
Telephones
Post box
ATM
Ticket machines
Toilets
Car park
Fully wheelchair accessible
 Ticket barriers

The station is in the Bedford zone of the PlusBus scheme, where train and bus tickets can be bought together to save money.

Future developments 
Bedford station will be rebuilt for East West Rail in 2023.

See also 
 Bedford St Johns railway station

Notes

References

External links 
 Marston Vale Community Rail Partnership

Buildings and structures in Bedford
Railway stations in Bedfordshire
DfT Category C1 stations
Former Midland Railway stations
Railway stations in Great Britain opened in 1859
Railway stations served by East Midlands Railway
Railway stations served by Govia Thameslink Railway
Railway stations served by West Midlands Trains
1859 establishments in England
Transport in Bedford
Train driver depots in England
East West Rail